Walter E. Riptoe (March 30, 1838 - ?) was a preacher and state legislator in Texas. A Republican, he served two terms in the Texas Senate during the Fifteenth Texas Legislature and Sixteenth Texas Legislature from 1876 to 1881, representing Marshall (Harrison) County. The Texas State Preservation Board has a photograph of him.

He was born in Montgomery, Alabama.

Texas Middle School students did a history project on him in 2018 and described him as a carpenter and teacher as well as a civil rights advocate.

See also
African-American officeholders during and following the Reconstruction era

References

Republican Party Texas state senators
African-American state legislators in Texas
1838 births
Year of death unknown
African-American politicians during the Reconstruction Era
Politicians from Montgomery, Alabama